Chittagong Ship Breaking Yard is located in Faujdarhat, Sitakunda Upazila, Bangladesh along the  Sitakunda coastal strip,  north-west of Chittagong. Handling about a fifth of the world's total, it was the world's largest ship breaking yard, until that record was taken by Alang in India. It employs over 200,000 Bangladeshis, and accounts for around one-half of all the steel in Bangladesh.

It is the world's second-largest ship breaking yard after Alang Ship Breaking Yard (India), followed by Gadani ship-breaking yard (Pakistan) and Aliağa Ship Breaking Yard (Turkey).

History

In 1960, after a severe cyclone, the Greek ship M D Alpine was stranded on the shores of Sitakunda, Chittagong.  It could not be re-floated and so remained there for several years. In 1965, Chittagong Steel House bought the ship and had it scrapped. It took years to scrap the vessel, but the work gave birth to the industry in Bangladesh.

During the Bangladesh Liberation War, a Pakistani ship Al Abbas was damaged by bombing. Later on, the ship was salvaged by a Soviet team who were working at Chittagong port at the time and the ship was brought to the Faujdarhat seashore. A local company, Karnafully Metal Works Ltd bought it as scrap in 1974 and introduced commercial ship breaking in the country.

The industry grew steadily through the 1980s and, by the middle of the 1990s, the country ranked number two in the world by tonnage scrapped.  In 2008, there were 26 ship breaking yards in the area, and in 2009 there were 40. From 2004 to 2008, the area was the largest ship-breaking yard in the world. However, by 2012 it had dropped from half to a fifth of worldwide ship-breaking.

At one stage the industry was a tourist attraction, but outsiders are no longer welcome due to its poor safety record; a local watchdog group claims that one worker dies a week and one is injured a day on average.

Workers have neither protective equipment nor financial security. In 2014, shipping company Hapag-Lloyd followed an earlier decision by Maersk to stop using the yard for breaking its old ships, despite the higher costs elsewhere.

A scene of the movie Avengers: Age of Ultron was shot at the ship breaking yards of Chittagong.

Gallery

See also 

 Alang Ship Breaking Yard
 List of ship breaking yards

References

External links 

 
 

Economy of Chittagong
Ship breaking
Economy of Bangladesh